Kenyon Jones (October 12, 1977 – August 18, 2005) was an American professional basketball player. At 6'10" (2.08 m) tall, he played at the center position. He played four seasons in Greece's top league, the Greek Basket League.

College career
Jones, from Beach High School, in Savannah, Georgia, signed with head coach Todd Bozeman at the University of California, Berkeley.  Jones played three seasons for the Golden Bears, averaging 6.0 points and 3.0 rebounds per game as a junior in the 1997–98 season.

Jones then transferred to the University of San Francisco for his senior season.  There he averaged 16.5 points and was named West Coast Conference player of the year.

Professional career
After graduation, Jones played four seasons in the Greek top-tier level Greek Basket League, with Panionios, Panathinaikos, and Maroussi. He also played with the Russian club Dynamo Moscow, during the 2003-04 season. Jones was invited to play with the Denver Nuggets NBA Summer League squad in 2005, but he did not make the team.

National team career
Jones was also a part of the senior Macedonian national basketball team.

Death
Jones died on August 18, 2005, at his home in Atlanta, Georgia. The basketball website Eurobasket.com, reported that he died of a heart attack.

References

External links
 FIBA Europe profile
 Euroleague profile

1977 births
2005 deaths
American expatriate basketball people in France
American expatriate basketball people in Greece
American expatriate basketball people in Russia
American men's basketball players
Basketball players from Savannah, Georgia
BC Dynamo Moscow players
California Golden Bears men's basketball players
Centers (basketball)
Macedonian men's basketball players
Maroussi B.C. players
Panathinaikos B.C. players
Panionios B.C. players
San Francisco Dons men's basketball players
STB Le Havre players